Tomczyk is a Polish surname, and may refer to:

 Dominik Tomczyk (born 1974), Polish basketball player
 Martin Tomczyk (born 1981), German racing driver
 Michael Tomczyk, computing pioneer
 Paweł Tomczyk (born 1998), Polish footballer
 Ryszard Tomczyk (born 1959), Polish politician and historian
 Ryszard Tomczyk (boxer), Polish boxer
 Stanisława Tomczyk, Polish Spiritualist medium

Polish-language surnames